The Axis of Insanity is a Big Finish Productions audio drama based on the long-running British science fiction television series Doctor Who.

Plot
The TARDIS, along with its crew of the Doctor, Peri and Erimem, lands at the Axis, a mysterious realm where the Time Lords keep broken timelines, splitting them off from the rest of the universe, so as not to affect the rest of the space-time continuum. However, experiments in one of these timelines is causing the others to fracture, and the Axis's Overseer has just been replaced by The Jester in a coup. Soon, the whole of reality begins to disintegrate...

Cast
The Doctor — Peter Davison
Peri — Nicola Bryant
Erimem — Caroline Morris
Tog — Marc Danbury
The Jester — Garrick Hagon
Carnival Barker — Daniel Hogarth
Bird Trader — Stephen Mansfield
The Overseer — Roy North
Jarra To — Liza Ross

Continuity
The Axis is revisited throughout the fourth series of the Gallifrey spin-off, starting with Reborn.

Notes
The story was originally to feature the Fifth Doctor, Nyssa and an adult Adric.
The story was recorded on 22 and 23 January 2004.
Writer Simon Furman is best known for his work on the comic book based on the Transformers toyline. This is his first full audio drama.

External links
Big Finish Productions – The Axis of Insanity

2004 audio plays
Fifth Doctor audio plays